14 Aquilae is a probable spectroscopic binary star system in the equatorial constellation of Aquila. 14 Aquilae is the Flamsteed designation though it also bears the Bayer designation g Aquilae.

The visible component is an A-type main sequence star with a stellar classification of A1 V. It has 3.25 times the mass of the Sun and  about twice the Sun's radius. The projected rotational velocity is relatively low at 23 km/s. The star is radiating 214 times the luminosity of the Sun from its photosphere at an effective temperature of 9,908 K.

References

External links
 Image 14 Aquilae
 HR 7209
 CCDM 19029-0342

A-type main-sequence stars
Aquila (constellation)
Aquilae, g
BD-03 4460
Aquilae, 14
176984
093526
7209